Sabelliphilidae is a family of copepods belonging to the order Cyclopoida.

Genera:
 Acaenomolgus Humes & Stock, 1972 
 Eupolymniphilus Humes & Boxshall, 1996
 Myxomolgoides Humes, 1975
 Myxomolgus Humes & Stock, 1972
 Nasomolgus Sewell, 1949
 Phoronicola Boxshall & Humes, 1988
 Sabelliphilus Sars, 1862
 Serpuliphilus Humes & Stock, 1972
 Terebelliphilus Kim, 2001

References

Cyclopoida